Dithyrostegia is a genus of Australian flowering plants in the family Asteraceae.

 Species
 Dithyrostegia amplexicaulis A.Gray - Western Australia
 Dithyrostegia gracilis P.S.Short - Western Australia

References

Gnaphalieae
Endemic flora of Australia
Asteraceae genera